The Wireless Infrastructure Association (WIA), formerly known as PCIA, is an American trade association for wireless providers and companies that build cell phone towers, rooftop wireless sites, and other facilities that transmit wireless communication signals. The Washington Post described the industry as "the people who build all those cell towers so you can actually make those calls, download that data." These technologies are collectively referred to as "wireless telecommunications infrastructure."

Examples of companies that are members of WIA include American Tower, Ericsson, Graybar, JMA Wireless, Qualcomm, and SBA Communications. In all, member companies own and run more than 125,000 towers and antennas in the U.S.

WIA advocates for a variety of issues before the federal government, on topics such as broadband deployment (the act of building wireless broadband infrastructure in the United States), utility pole attachment (adding wireless signal components to utility poles that already exist), wireless network resiliency, public safety, and wireless competition. WIA hosts an annual conference and trade show called the Connectivity Expo, also known as Connect (X). Previously WIA hosted the Wireless Infrastructure Show.

People 
The Chairman of WIA is Jeffrey A. Stoops, president and chief executive officer of SBA Communications Corp. The previous chairman was David Weisman, president of InSite Wireless Group, which was an independent tower company. American Tower announced an agreement to buy InSite's assets in late 2020 for approximately $3,5 billion.

Jonathan Adelstein, a former FCC commissioner, is the president and CEO of WIA. Adelstein worked in public service for 25 years before joining WIA. In February 2014, Adelstein told C-SPAN that his goal was to bring wireless connectivity to everyone in the United States. Tim House is WIA's Executive Vice President. Before WIA, House worked in consumer product marketing at Discovery Communications.

History

1949 
WIA was founded in 1949. The focus of the group has shifted as technologies have advanced. At various times throughout WIA's history, it has focused on land mobile radio, paging, messaging, personal communications services, and tower and antenna siting.

2012 
In 2012, WIA submitted an amicus curiae brief in the U.S. Supreme Court case Arlington v. FCC. WIA argued in support of the FCC in the case, arguing that local delays in approval of broadband projects are a national problem. The amicus curiae brief cited evidence that over 3,300 wireless service facility siting applications were pending before local jurisdictions throughout the country, and that around 180 of those applications had been pending for over three years.

In 2012, Congress passed and President Barack Obama signed the Middle Class Tax Relief and Job Creation Act. The law included a provision related to the wireless infrastructure industry. Specifically, section 6409(a) of the law orders states and local governments to approve requests made by companies to collocate , remove or replace transmission equipment on existing wireless towers or base stations. The law included an exception: if the action substantially changes the physical dimensions of the tower or base station, then the law's protection doesn't apply. The provision and the authority it prescribed is described by the wireless industry as "collocation-by-right".

2013 

In 2013, WIA submitted comments to the FCC that expressed support in speeding up broadband deployment. WIA helped Congress write legislation that funded broadband deployment. WIA had asked Congress to include infrastructure providers in the list of eligible recipients of federal broadband funding. WIA influenced members of the congressional committees that funded the $4.7 billion Broadband Technology Opportunities Program (BTOP) to make eligible wireless carriers, backhaul providers, and tower companies for funds.

In 2013, Cisco, American Tower, Dynis, and WIA created a program called Warriors 4 Wireless. The organization helps military veterans train and apply for jobs at wireless companies. The program's stated goal is to place 5,000 veterans in jobs by 2015. WIA has pledged money to the program.

2020 
WIA advocated an effort passed by the FCC commonly referred to as  The “5G Upgrade Order,” which made key clarifications for wireless deployment.

The Order:

 Set a clear demarcation as to when the 60-day shot clock for local approval begins
 Clarified which new equipment qualifies for streamlined approval
 Ensured local governments cannot misuse concealment and aesthetic conditions to limit the ability to quickly upgrade concealed infrastructure.

2021 
WIA has been the leading voice in lobbying Congress to include wireless for funding eligibility in its landmark infrastructure bill. The bipartisan-passed legislation will provide $65 billion for broadband deployment and access. This legislation will promote wireless infrastructure deployment, with a priority on unserved communities. WIA helped convince Congress and the Administration to provide agencies with the needed flexibility to allow all broadband technologies, including mobile and fixed wireless, the opportunity to compete for funding. The all of-the-above broadband strategy, as pursued by WIA, will help close the digital divide and win the race to 5G.

Advocacy 

One of the main issues facing the wireless infrastructure industry is related to federal vs. local oversight of wireless infrastructure activity.

Federal vs. local oversight
In a February 2014 article in National Law Review, Washington telecommunications attorneys Dave Thomas and Douglas A. Svor explained the issue and the battle played out between the wireless industry and local governments.

In their article, Thomas and Svor state that spectrum and infrastructure serve as the most important aspects of federal communications laws in terms of being good for the economy and American competitiveness. For decades, the FCC has worked to make sure that critical communications infrastructure can get built with as little hassle as possible.

In April 2014, the FCC proposed to simplify the regulatory review process for wireless facilities. These facilities include DAS and small cells (see Small cells and HetNet Forum below for more information).

Small cells are built smaller than traditional cells that are typically fixed to large wireless antenna towers. Infrastructure companies attach small cells to utility poles, street light poles, and even traffic lights. The wireless industry has supported the FCC's work in the areas mentioned above, while local governments have typically been opposed.

Thomas and Svor wrote:

List of major public policy issues for industry

HetNet Forum 

HetNets, short for "Heterogeneous Networks", are a combination of technologies that make quality wireless broadband possible. According to international communications company Ericsson, heterogeneous networks help wireless customers enjoy activities that require a large amount of data, such as watching streaming videos, uploading photos and using cloud storage services. HetNets use both radio and cellular technologies.

To advocate for deployment of HetNet, WIA runs a membership forum called the HetNet Forum. The purpose of the forum is to advance the development of heterogeneous networks in the United States, as well as to push policies related to distributed antenna systems (DAS), small cells, and fiber backhaul. Several major U.S. wireless carriers, such as AT&T, T-Mobile and Verizon Wireless, serve as governing members of the forum.

Prior to April 2013, the HetNet Forum had been called the DAS Forum. WIA changed the name to accommodate a growing membership that represented a more diverse group of technologies. Instead of running a forum focusing only on DAS, WIA expanded the forum to focus on several technologies such as microcells, picocells, Wi-Fi and remote radio units, in addition to DAS.

Other trade associations, such as the Small Cell Forum, have competed with WIA for members from the small cell industry.

Criticism 
In 2014, Senator Al Franken criticized the "revolving door" hiring placement of former FCC commissioners. Specifically, Franken criticized the hiring of FCC Commissioner Meredith Baker by Comcast. Franken did not mention WIA in his remarks, but an OpenSecrets.org article covering the remarks mentioned the hiring of former Commissioner Jonathan Adelstein by WIA.

Dictionaries and encyclopedias

 Tower and Antenna Siting at FCC Encyclopedia
 Broadband Acceleration at FCC Encyclopedia
 Broadband and Internet in the Consumer Publications Library at the U.S. Federal Communications Commission (FCC)

Government documents
 Wireless Telecommunications Bureau at the Federal Communications Commission (FCC)* Understanding Wireless Communications in Public Safety at FCC
 16th Mobile Wireless Competition Report at FCC
 National Broadband Map, a tool published by the FCC, allows citizens to enter any address to view wired and wireless broadband services available.
 Public Safety Wireless Technology Links at the National Institute of Standards and Technology (NIST)

Literature

News
 Wireless communications selected news and commentary at The New York Times
 Wireless infrastructure selected news and commentary at Fierce Wireless
 Wireless carriers collected news and videos at Fox Business

Technical guides
 This HetNet visual aide by Ericsson shows how various components, such as Wi-Fi, base stations, and wireless transmitters work together to form a Heterogeneous Network (HetNet).
 Pole Attachments at National Association of Regulatory Utility Commissioners (NARUC)

Video
 Jonathan Adelstein 
 
 Announcing the National Broadband Plan video by Julius Genachowski, Chairman of the U.S. Federal Communications Commission, at broadband.gov

WIA website links
  
Connectivity Expo  
 2014 Wireless Infrastructure Show
 Wireless Broadband Infrastructure: A Catalyst for GDP and Job Growth 2013-2017 report published by WIA (September 2013)

Website directories

Gallery

See also 

 National Telecommunications and Information Administration
 Federal Communications Act
 Federal Communications Commission (FCC)
 First Responder Network Authority (FirstNet)
 HetNet
 Policies promoting wireless broadband in the United States

Notes

References

External links 

Telecommunications organizations
Wireless networking
Trade associations based in the United States
Construction organizations
Telecommunication industry